Maladzyechna Voblast or Molodechno Oblast was a Voblast of the Byelorussian SSR. Initially the Voblast was formed on December 4, 1939, following the annexation of West Belarus into the BSSR from the Second Polish Republic as the Vileyka Voblast. However, after the liberation of Byelorussia by the Red Army in July 1944, most of the pre-war civil administration was not possible for a number of reasons, one of which was that the city of Vileyka was heavily damaged during the war, and the transportation links between it and the rest of the Voblast were too.

However the nearby city of Maladziečna (only 20 km away from Vileyka) escaped heavy destruction, and as a result on 20 September 1944, the Maladzyechna Voblast of Byelorussia was established. Initially it contained all 14 raions. These raions were Astravets, Ashmyany, Volozhin, Ilya, Iwye, Krivichi, Kurenets (Its center was relocated in Vileyka and renamed as Vileyka in 1946), Molodechno, Miadzieł, Pastavy, Radashkovichy, Smorgon, Svir and Yuratishki. However, on January 8, 1954, in course of administrative-territorial reform of the BSSR, the neighbouring Polatsk and Baranavichy Voblasts (along with others) were disestablished.

Maladzyechna Voblast incorporated 10 raions (Ivyanets from Baranavichy; Braslav, Vidzy, Hlybokaye, Dzisna, Dokshytsy, Dunilovichi, Miory, Plisa and Sharkawshchyna from Polatsk) from the two Voblasts with its size growing from 14.8 to 24.3 thousand square kilometres. At same reforms, Iwye raion was passed to Hrodna Voblast. In 1957, Ilya raion was dissolved and was attached to Vileyka one. In 1959, Dzisna and Svir raions were dissolved and were attached to successively Miadzieł and Miory ones. So that, number of raions of the oblast was reduced to 20. However, on 20 January 1960, Maladzyechna Oblast too was disestablished. Its territory, with 848 thousand people was divided between the modern Vitsebsk (Raions of Braslav, Vidzy, Hlybokaye, Dokshytsy, Dunilovichi, Miory, Plisa, Pastavy and Sharkawshchyna), Hrodna (Raions of Ostrovets, Oshmyany, Smorgon and Yuratishki and Bogdanov village of Volozhin one) and Minsk Voblasts (Raions of Maladzyechna, Vileyka, Volozhin (Except Bogdanov village), Ivyanets, Kryvichi, Miadzieł and Radashkovichy), with the city of Maladziečna being incorporated into the latter. This turned to be the last of the administrative division reform in Belarus, and since then the Voblast borders gained their present form.

External links
Information on WHP 

Former subdivisions of Belarus